"Gettin' Over You" (originally titled "Gettin' Over") is a song by French DJ David Guetta and American singer Chris Willis, from Guetta's fourth studio album, One Love. "Gettin' Over You" features additional vocals by Fergie and hip hop duo LMFAO, and was released as the lead single from One More Love on 12 April 2010.

The song became Guetta's first number-one hit in France and topped the dance charts in the United Kingdom and United States. It reached top five positions in Australia, Austria, Ireland, Italy and New Zealand.

Background and composition
The lyrics are written by Fergie, Willis, will.i.am and LMFAO. will.i.am was originally intended to perform the vocals alongside Willis and Fergie but he was replaced by LMFAO. In an interview with Digital Spy, Guetta described the song as "one of my more traditional guitar-sounding club tracks – in the vein of 'Love Is Gone'." He said since he refused to let The Black Eyed Peas record the original version for their album The E.N.D., they decided to re-record the song with Fergie. Guetta explained, "Even after I refused to let the Peas have it, Fergie was still saying, 'I love that track!' So I said, 'If you still want to do it, then we'll do it together'. I wanted to keep Chris Willis on there because I've been working with him since the beginning [...] He's the best singer on the planet."

Redfoo from LMFAO told MTV News the concept of the song: "You're in love with a girl and then you guys separate," he said, then joked, "She probably got with Lil Jon or somebody," before continuing, "So I'm gonna party 'til you come get me."

"Gettin' Over You" is written in the key of F minor and is in common time with a tempo of 130 beats per minute. The song uses open fifths instead of a chord progression.

Critical reception
Robert Copsey of Digital Spy gave the song three out of five stars. He felt that despite the song's "pounding beats and jaggedy axe" that "LMFAO ruin[s] the breakdown, proving that too many cooks can spoil an otherwise tasty electro-housey broth." Chris Willis's vocal performance was praised by Entertainment Weekly stating: "Willis has a pleasant rasp to his voice, and he guts this one out like the lives of millions of glowsticks hang in the balance". A reviewer from FemaleFirst' stated that "Gettin' Over You" is a "huge summer anthem" and gave it four out of five stars.

Music video
The music video began production on 20 April 2010 with Rich Lee who has in the past filmed videos for The Black Eyed Peas. The music video premiered on Tuesday, 18 May 2010. It features Guetta, Willis, Fergie and LMFAO all producing the song in a recording studio. A young guy then overhears them and gets his friends who bring recording equipment which draws in more young people who enter the studio, Guetta, Fergie, and Willis are surprised at first but then accept their presence and go outside with the fans, they finish their song, all the young people applaud the performance.

Track listing

Charts

Weekly charts

Year-end charts

Certifications

Release history

See also
List of number-one hits of 2010 (France)
List of number-one singles and albums of 2010 (Scotland)
List of number-one singles from the 2010s (UK)
List of number-one dance hits of 2010 (UK)
List of number-one dance singles of 2010 (U.S.)
List of number-one dance airplay hits of 2010 (U.S.)

References

External links

David Guetta songs
Fergie (singer) songs
LMFAO songs
Chris Willis songs
2010 singles
Number-one singles in Scotland
SNEP Top Singles number-one singles
UK Singles Chart number-one singles
Songs written by David Guetta
Songs written by Fergie (singer)
Songs written by will.i.am
House music songs
Songs written by Sandy Vee
Songs written by Frédéric Riesterer
Song recordings produced by Sandy Vee
Songs written by Jean-Claude Sindres
2010 songs
Songs written by Redfoo
Songs written by Sky Blu (rapper)
Song recordings produced by David Guetta
Music videos directed by Rich Lee